The 2001 Kremlin Cup was a tennis tournament played on indoor carpet courts at the Olympic Stadium in Moscow in Russia that was part of the International Series of the 2001 ATP Tour and of Tier I of the 2001 WTA Tour. The tournament ran from 1 October through 7 October 2001.

Finals

Men's singles

 Yevgeny Kafelnikov defeated  Nicolas Kiefer 6–4, 7–5
 It was Kafelnikov's 2nd title of the year and the 24th of his career.

Women's singles

 Jelena Dokić defeated  Elena Dementieva 6–3, 6–3
 It was Dokić's 3rd title of the year and the 3rd of her career.

Men's doubles

 Max Mirnyi /  Sandon Stolle defeated  Mahesh Bhupathi /  Jeff Tarango 6–3, 6–0
 It was Mirnyi's 1st title of the year and the 9th of his career. It was Stolle's 4th title of the year and the 20th of his career.

Women's doubles

 Martina Hingis /  Anna Kournikova defeated  Elena Dementieva /  Lina Krasnoroutskaya 7–6(7–1), 6–3
 It was Hingis' 1st title of the year and the 35th of her career. It was Kournikova's 2nd title of the year and the 14th of her career.

References

External links
 Official website 
 Official website 
 ATP Tournament Profile
 WTA Tournament Profile

Kremlin Cup
Kremlin Cup
Kremlin Cup
Kremlin Cup
Kremlin Cup
Kremlin Cup